Kate Airey OBE is a British diplomat serving as the British High Commissioner to Uganda since November 2020.

Early life
She was born and raised in Birmingham, UK and graduated from University of Oxford in 1999 with a BSc in Geography.

Career
She began her career working at Oxfam in September 1999 and moved to Shell International a year later, working as a Senior Consultant in Africa and Europe.

Airey joined the Foreign, Commonwealth & Development Office in 2005, and had roles in London including Africa Energy Adviser, Lead on Strategy, and Lead on Prosperity.

She held postings overseas in Abuja, Nigeria between 2007 and 2010 and was based in Freetown, Sierra Leone between 2014 and 2015, leading the response to the Ebola crisis both in Freetown as Deputy Head of the UK response and in London as Head of the FCDO Ebola Task Force, coordinating the UK end of the Foreign Policy response. For her work, she received an OBE in the Queen's New Years Honours in 2016.

She moved onto Namibia as the Head of the Nigeria Whitehall Unit, before becoming British High Commissioner to Namibia in Windhoek in November 2017, and started in January 2018.

She was appointed British High Commissioner to Uganda at the end of 2019, and started in November 2020.

References

Living people
High Commissioners of the United Kingdom to Uganda
High Commissioners of the United Kingdom to Namibia
Year of birth missing (living people)
People from Birmingham, West Midlands
Alumni of the University of Oxford